The 2005 Logan Airport runway incursion was a near-collision that occurred at approximately 7:40 p.m. EDT on June 9, 2005 between US Airways Flight 1170 (US1170) and Aer Lingus Flight 132 (EI132). EI132 was an Airbus A330-300 aircraft, owned and operated by the Irish airline Aer Lingus, destined for Shannon, Ireland and carrying 12 crew members and 260 passengers. US1170 was a Boeing 737-300 US Airways flight destined for Philadelphia and carrying six crew members and 103 passengers. The near-collision took place on the runway at Logan International Airport (BOS) in Boston, Massachusetts.

Incident
 

To reduce radio congestion and consequences resulting from pilot or controller error, airports with a large number of operations will typically split the tower (local) controller into two or more positions. This was the case on the evening of June 9, 2005 when the two incident flights were handled by different controllers. The local control west controller was responsible for Aer Lingus Flight 132 and the local control east controller was responsible for US Airways Flight 1170.

At 19:39:10, Aer Lingus Flight 132 was cleared for takeoff from Runway 15R by local control west. Five seconds later, local control east cleared US Airways Flight 1170 for takeoff from Runway 9, which intersects with Runway 15R; the aircraft had essentially been sent on a collision course. With the airport terminals between the two aircraft as the takeoffs began, the flight crews could not initially see each other.

During the takeoff roll, the US Airways first officer noticed the other plane and realized that they could collide. He realized that at the runway intersection both aircraft would be slightly airborne. Telling the captain to "keep it down," he pushed the control column forward. He was able to keep the aircraft from lifting off the runway, allowing it to reach the intersection and pass under the other aircraft as it took off. The two planes passed within an estimated  of one another, with the Aer Lingus aircraft flying over the US Airways aircraft. According to the NTSB report, the US Airways flight had already achieved its V1 speed and could no longer safely abort takeoff. Therefore, the flight crew continued down the runway and lifted off after passing through the intersection.

Superior Airmanship Award
US Airways captain Henry Jones and first officer Jim Dannahower were later awarded a Superior Airmanship Award from the Air Line Pilots Association (ALPA) for their quick reactions and expert adjustment of their takeoff maneuver.

Probable cause

The NTSB completed its investigation and found that the east tower controller had given the west tower controller permission for the Aer Lingus to depart on 15R. While coordinating other traffic, he forgot about releasing that aircraft and cleared the US Airways flight for takeoff. Local procedures required the east controller to wait until the departure on 15R had passed through the intersection before clearing the aircraft on Runway 9 for takeoff. The NTSB reported that the probable cause of the incident was that the east local controller failed to follow FAA Order 7110.65 and local procedures, which resulted in a runway incursion.

After the incident, the Boston tower changed its procedures so that only the west local controller may initiate a departure on the crossing Runway 15R, and that once the east controller accepts the release, the aircraft must be cleared for takeoff within five seconds. Further, to reduce the chance of this type of incident happening again, aircraft must not be held on Runway 9 waiting for their takeoff clearance while there is a departure on 15R. Once the departure has cleared the intersection, local west must inform the east controller that the intersection has been cleared.

See also 

List of accidents and incidents involving commercial aircraft
2001 Japan Airlines mid-air incident, a near miss of two Japan Airlines aircraft caused by ATC error
2007 San Francisco International Airport runway incursion, a narrowly avoided runway incursion in San Francisco caused by ATC error
Air Canada Flight 759

References

External links
Photos of the US Airways jet
Photos of the Aer Lingus jet

National Transportation Safety Board
Aer Lingus jet Flight Data Recorder readout
US Airways jet Flight Data Recorder readout

Airliner accidents and incidents in Massachusetts
Aviation accidents and incidents caused by air traffic controller error
US Airways accidents and incidents
Aviation accidents and incidents in the United States in 2005
Runway incursions
Aer Lingus accidents and incidents
Accidents and incidents involving the Boeing 737 Classic
Accidents and incidents involving the Airbus A330
2005 in Boston
2005 Logan Airport runway incursion
Aviation accidents and incidents in 2005
Disasters in Boston